Bernard Pons (18 July 1926 – 27 April 2022) was a French politician and medical doctor who was a member of the Union of Democrats for the Republic from 1971 to 1976 and a member of the Rally for the Republic party thereafter. He served as Secretary General of Rally for the Republic, Minister for Transport, and continued as a special advisor to the Union for a Popular Movement until 2008 after his retirement from active politics in 2002.

Early life 
Born Claude Bernard Pons on 18 July 1926 in Béziers, Pons qualified as a doctor and worked as a general practitioner.

Political career 
Pons was elected to the lower house of the French parliament in 1967 and served as a member of this house until 2002. He served in the Ministry of Agriculture from 22 June 1969 to 28 March 1973. In the government of Jacques Chirac, he served as Minister for Overseas Territory and travelled to Noumea to solve the Ouvéa cave hostage taking situation. In the government of Alain Juppé, he served as Minister of Transport.

Pons played a role in helping the Cahors wine region to regain its reputation. He successfully lobbied for Appellation d'origine contrôlée for the region. This brought significant money to the region.

In December 1997 he was appointed a commander of the Order of Tahiti Nui.

Governmental functions

Secretary of State for Agriculture: 1969–1973

Minister of Overseas Departments and Territories: 1986–1988

Minister of Planning, Infrastructure and Transport: May–November 1995

Minister of Equipment, Housing, Transport and Tourism: 1995–1997

Electoral mandates

European Parliament

Member of the European Parliament: 1984–1985 (Resignation). Elected in 1984

National Assembly of France

President of the Rally for the Republic Group in the National Assembly: 1988–1995 (Became minister in 1995). Elected in 1988, reelected in 1993

Member of the National Assembly of France for Lot (department): 1967–1969 (Became secretary of State in 1969) / 1973–1978. Elected in 1967, reelected in 1968, 1973

Member of the National Assembly of France for Essonne: 1978–1981. Elected in 1978

Member of the National Assembly of France for Paris: 1981–1986 (Became minister in 1986) / 1988–1993 (Became minister in 1995) / 1997–2002. Elected in 1981, reelected in 1986, 1988, 1993, 1997

General Council

General councillor of Lot (department): 1967–1979. Reelected in 1973

Municipal Council

Councillor of Paris: 1983–2008. Reelected in 1989, 1995, 2001

References 

1926 births
2022 deaths
People from Béziers
Politicians from Occitania (administrative region)
Union of Democrats for the Republic politicians
Rally for the Republic politicians
Union for a Popular Movement politicians
French Ministers of Overseas France
French Ministers of Tourism
Transport ministers of France
Deputies of the 3rd National Assembly of the French Fifth Republic
Deputies of the 4th National Assembly of the French Fifth Republic
Deputies of the 7th National Assembly of the French Fifth Republic
Deputies of the 8th National Assembly of the French Fifth Republic
Deputies of the 9th National Assembly of the French Fifth Republic
Deputies of the 10th National Assembly of the French Fifth Republic
Deputies of the 11th National Assembly of the French Fifth Republic
MEPs for France 1984–1989
Chevaliers of the Légion d'honneur
Commanders of the Order of Tahiti Nui